Alexandria City High School (formerly named T. C. Williams High School) is a public high school in the City of Alexandria, Virginia, United States, just outside of Washington, D.C. The school has an enrollment of over 4,100 students. The high school is located near the geographic center of Alexandria and is referred to informally as the "Titans" by students, faculty and locals. The school's football team was the subject of the 2000 film Remember the Titans.

The school offers numerous Advanced Placement courses for its students. Alexandria City HS has an Army Junior ROTC program which participated in President Barack Obama's Inaugural Parade.
The ACHS Marching Band travels to competitions up and down the East Coast.

The school was originally named after Thomas Chambliss Williams, former superintendent of Alexandria City Public Schools from the 1930s to 1963 and an ardent supporter of racial segregation. The school was renamed Alexandria City High School on July 1, 2021, following protests against the school being named after Williams.

History
T. C. Williams, a four-year high school, initially opened its doors to eighth graders, freshmen, sophomores, and juniors in 1965, and graduated its first class in June 1967. It was Alexandria's third public high school and Minnie Howard Middle School was its "feeder" school, for seventh and eighth graders.

In 1965 the city integrated schools. In 1971 the city consolidated all high school students into T. C. Williams, so that the school became Alexandria's only public senior high school serving 11th and 12th graders. The city's freshmen and sophomores attended Francis C. Hammond and George Washington, the other former four-year schools involved in the three school consolidation. While T. C. Williams and George Washington were already integrated in 1971, Hammond was nearly all white, while the city was about one-fifth black.

Increasing enrollment prompted plans for a new school. In January 2004, the Alexandria School Board approved a plan to build an entirely new school building at the existing location to provide more space. The new building opened on September 4, 2007. The original T. C. Williams building was demolished in January 2008. The new T. C. Williams campus was certified LEED Gold by the U.S. Green Building Council in 2009.

The gym of the original T. C. Williams building was named after Gerry Bertier, a member of the Titans' 1971 state championship football team who was paralyzed in a car crash and died 10 years later in a second auto accident near Charlottesville, Virginia. The newly constructed basketball court was named in honor of the late Earl Lloyd on December 1, 2007. Lloyd attended Parker-Gray High School, which was Alexandria's all-black high school at the time. Lloyd was the first African-American to play in the NBA.

The football stadium is named Parker-Gray Stadium in deference to the former pre-segregation high school, whose campus was sold for office buildings in the 1980s. The football field was grass until an artificial turf was installed in 2006.

During his run for the Democratic nomination, Barack Obama held a rally at T. C. Williams on February 10, 2008.

The school system is currently undergoing long term planning about potential future expansion or other changes to the school.

Currently, "A. C." serves 10th through 12th grades while freshmen go to the A.C. Minnie Howard Campus, located 0.6 miles (1.0 km) from the main building. Two middle schools, Francis C. Hammond Middle School (1.8 miles west), and George Washington Middle School (2.0 miles south east), serve 6th through 8th grade students and are housed in the former high schools.

2020 movement for name change
In 2020, in part inspired by the civil rights protests across the United States, a push to rename T.C. Williams began. Advocates for the change argued that the school's namesake, former superintendent Thomas Chambliss Williams, was a segregationist and had been unwilling to integrate Alexandria City schools. Although there had been past community efforts to rename the school, including in two efforts in the late 1990s and early 2000s, the efforts in 2020 were significantly larger and attracted more media coverage. A petition was circulated in June 2020 and submitted to the school board later that month. ACPS announced it would begin a review of the school's name, with a public engagement portion to be held in the fall of 2020. A report with recommendations is expected to be completed and sent to the school board in the spring of 2021. The move to rename T.C. Williams sparked a similar movement to name another ACPS school, Matthew Maury Elementary. In November 2020, the Alexandria City Public Schools School Board voted unanimously to rename the school, with the name Alexandria City High School selected on April 8, 2021.

Demographics
As of November 2017, Alexandria City High School's student body is 42.3% Hispanic, 28.8% African American, 22.0% White, 4.6% Asian, 0.2% Native Hawaiian/Pacific Islander and 2.1% Multi-racial.

Alexandria City High also has a thriving International Academy program, part of the wider International Academy Network, which serves to accommodate the large surge of immigrants to the Washington, D.C., area by teaching English to non-native speakers alongside a rigorous, credit-earning high school curriculum. The International Academy currently has an enrollment of around 600 students, and contains speakers of over 60 languages.

Minnie Howard Campus 
The Minnie Howard Campus, which currently serves as the ninth grade campus of Alexandria City, was built in 1954 as a 1st–7th grade elementary school. The transition to a 9th grade campus was made in 1969 due to a large and fast growth of the elementary age population in the area. The school is a single building with a field for lacrosse, soccer, and various other sports.

In 2019, because of capacity issues at both Minnie Howard and the main campus, the city approved on a plan to build a new, larger building on the Minnie Howard Campus with space for 1,600 students. Once completed, instead of 9th grade at Minnie Howard and 10th through 12th at the main campus, the school will be a "connected high school network", with both campuses serving grades 9 through 12 and programs spread between the two locations. After the new building is built on some existing multi-purpose fields, the old Minnie Howard building will be razed and replaced with a new field, bus loop, and parking.

In March 2022, construction began on the new building and is scheduled to open for the 2024–2025 school year and the new multi-purpose field open in scheduled for 2025.

Academics 
Alexandria City offers more than a dozen different AP courses. It has been ranked by the 2016 Washington Post "Challenge Index"  with an index of 2.836. Under the leadership of Dr. Manu Patel, T. C. was the first Virginia high school to defeat Thomas Jefferson High School for Science and Technology in Fairfax County, Virginia, at the Science Bowl. The school also offers five foreign languages to students: Spanish, German, French, Latin, and Chinese.

Alexandria City allows students to apply into specialized academies within the school. These include the STEM academy and Governor's Health Sciences Academy, a collaborative effort with George Washington University that when successfully completed provides students with guaranteed admissions into the George Washington University School of Medicine & Health Sciences.

In March 2010, Alexandria City school was a persistently low achieving school based on its average standardized test scores.

Technology initiative
A.C. offers Google Chromebooks to all of its students. The initiative, which began in the 2004–2005 school year, provides every student with their own personal computer, as well as campus-wide wireless Internet access. Wireless access is available at the school during daytime hours and in the evenings at the school library.
Internet access is restricted and blocks download sites, entertainment sites, and others that could distract students from their work during class. For students that may have trouble obtaining internet access outside of school, mobile broadband devices are available to students who need them.

Extra-curricular activities
A. C. teams play in the AAA Patriot District of Region 6C, formerly the AAA Northern Region. The school mascot is a Titan. The school colors, blue, white and red, are a synthesis of the former colors of the three pre-1971 four-year high schools: blue (from G. W.), white (from Hammond), and red (T. C. W.). The Titans are best known for their football program, which the movie Remember the Titans was based upon. The boys' basketball program, a consistent powerhouse with 12 district, 10 regional, and 2 state championships (most recently in 2008) has also gained statewide recognition. The rowing team has won numerous state and national championships, the most recent being a gold medal in the State Championship for the men's 4V team. A. C. has won state championships in football, soccer, cross country, indoor and outdoor track. The football program has won three Virginia AAA state championships: 1971, 1984, and 1987, all of which the Titans finished ranked in the top ten nationally, and the 1971 team was made famous in the movie Remember the Titans, released in 2000.  A. C. students managed the feat of winning all three boys' state running championships in consecutive school years, winning the 1991 Cross Country, 1992 Indoor Track, 1992 Outdoor Track, 1992 Cross Country, 1993 Indoor Track, and 1993 Outdoor Track State Championships. They were nationally recognized in 1993 when they became the first ever U.S. high school 4 × 100 meter relay team to defeat the Jamaicans at Penn Relays.

A. C. boys soccer won the Virginia 6A state championship in 2014 and finished the season ranked number one in the Washington, DC, area and number 9 nationally, evoking the slogan "Remember These Titans." The girls' volleyball team won the state title in the pandemic-shortened 2020–2021 season and again in 2022–2023. Girls' basketball and boys' tennis teams have all captured district championships since 2006. Additionally, the soccer team captured a state title in 2014, with a 2–0 win over Washington-Lee High School.

Because A. C. is the only public high school in Alexandria City, and the only non-Fairfax County high school in the Patriot District, the Titans do not have a sole rival school. The Titans do have a rivalry against Lake Braddock Secondary School because of recent competition. The Titans have developed rivalries against Hayfield Secondary School in recent years due to the success of both schools' basketball teams, as well as West Potomac High School, which is located close to Alexandria.  Recently, A.C.'s rivalry with Hayfield was partially severed as Hayfield moved into another district due to a decline in enrollment. The two schools, which competed against each other in the 2009 Boys' Basketball Northern Region Championship Game, both missed the regional playoffs in 2010 due to eligibility issues of players.  A. C. had to forfeit 12 wins and lost two players including a key starter for the rest of the season. They lost in the first round of the district tournament.

Football and Remember the Titans
T. C. and its former football coaches, Herman Boone and Bill Yoast, were the subject of the 2000 motion picture Remember the Titans, starring Denzel Washington and Will Patton. The movie was a heavily fictionalized dramatization of the consolidation of Alexandria's three public high schools into one in the fall of 1971. That year, ACPS consolidated its three four-year high schools into a single two-year school, teaching solely juniors and seniors. As a result, the best of the varsity football squads at George Washington High School (converted to a middle school), Hammond High School (converted to a middle school) and T. C. Williams High School united in what amounted to an all-city, all-star team at T. C. Williams. The city's public schools were legally desegregated in 1959, but the three high schools had become racially imbalanced during the 1960s, due to redlining. Racial tension is one of the themes of the film. Yoast was the head coach at Hammond, who won the state title in 1970, while Boone was a head coach at E.J. Hayes High School in Williamston, North Carolina, with five state championships and a 99–8 record in nine seasons, from 1961 through 1969. He was not retained after a consolidation and integration of two high schools. Boone was hired as an assistant at T.C. Williams, and expected to be to Yoast's assistant after the Alexandria consolidation in 1971.

The climax of the movie is the fictionalized 1971 AAA state championship football game between T. C. Williams and George C. Marshall High School. The dramatic license taken in the movie was to convert what was actually a mid-season matchup between T. C. Williams and Marshall into a made-for-Hollywood state championship. In reality, the Marshall game was the toughest game T. C. Williams played all year and the actual state championship (against Andrew Lewis High School of Salem) was a 27–0 blowout. As depicted in the movie, the real Titans won the Marshall game on a fourth down come-from-behind play at the very end of the game.

T. C. Williams was referenced in the "My No Good Reason" episode of the television show Scrubs.  Three actors wearing T. C. Williams letter jackets appear towards the end of the episode. Donald Faison, who plays Dr. Turk on the sitcom, also starred in Remember the Titans as Petey Jones. Jones died in July 2019, aged 65.

Rugby 
Alexandria City has both boys and girls varsity rugby teams. Coached for the last 16 years by Jeff Murphy, they currently compete against teams in the DC metro area; including Gonzaga College High School, Landon, and The Heights School.   The Titans program has produced notable players such as US Air force and Seattle Seawolves forward Capt. Eric Duechle.

Rowing
A.C. is known for its nationally and internationally competitive rowing program, which has its own boathouse on the Alexandria bank of the Potomac River. A.C. Crew has claimed state, national, and international championships. The program has produced several Olympic athletes, most recently Nick Peterson and Linda Miller, who represented the United States at the 2000 Summer Games in Sydney, Australia.

The TC Williams boys crew is the successor to the first high school rowing program in the Washington metro area.  In 1947, Jack Franklin and Julian Whitestone began training young men from Alexandria's George Washington High School (now Middle School) at the Old Dominion Boat Club. Francis Hammond High School opened in 1956 and soon had its own crew, as did the new TC Williams High School in 1964.  George Washington and Hammond merged with TC in 1971.

Over the years, these crews have won medals at local, state, national and international competitions including the Stotesbury Cup, the SRAA Nationals and the Canadian Scholastic Championship.  Rowers trained at TC have gone on to college success, and the program has produced Olympic rowers, and members of the US National and Junior National teams.

Arts
A.C. is also known for its strides in the arts. Its band program continues to grow and get national coverage, playing across the country, most recently at the 2014 Sugar Bowl. The school also houses thriving programs in Orchestra, Choir, Visual Art, and Theater, the latter of which is continuing to rise in popularity.

The A.C. Theater department participates in both the Cappies program and the VHSL's One-Act Competition, faring very well in both arenas. In recent memory, three one-act plays, "Ladying", "Shuffling", and "The Brick Joke", have made it to the Regional level of One-Acts, in 2010, 2013, and 2020 respectively. The A.C. Drama Department has also received attention for choosing shows that are considered risky for high schools, including 2010s Chicago; Rent and The Laramie Project in 2011; 2012's The Island of Doctor Moreau, the 2014 production of A Chorus Line, and the 2015 production of Twilight: Los Angeles, 1992.

Notable alumni

 Diedrich Bader – actor and comedian
 Ronnie Bass – member of 1971 State Championship team featured in the 2000 film Remember the Titans, played college football at South Carolina
 Gerry Bertier – American football player, wheelchair athlete, member of 1971 State Championship team featured in the 2000 film Remember the Titans
 Katherine Boo – journalist
 Daniel Patrick Boyd – Convicted for being a part of Raleigh jihad group
 Keith Burns – former NFL player and coach
 David A. Bray – executive at the Federal Communications Commission
 Jason Butler Harner – actor
 Charles Esten – actor and comedian
 John Gardner Ford – businessman
 Steven Ford – actor (Class of 1974)
 J. Holiday – R&B singer-songwriter
 Bruce Kelly – radio programmer (Class of 1974)
 Susan M. Kidwell – paleontologist (Class of 1976)
 Thad Levine – General Manager, Senior Vice President Minnesota Twins (Class of 1990)
 Noah Lyles – Professional Athlete (sprinter) (Class of 2016)
 Jamie Mason – Author
 Dermot Mulroney – actor
 Kieran Mulroney – actor and director
 Dean Muhtadi – WWE Wrestler Mojo Rawley, former NFL player, host of TMZ Sports (Class of 2004)
 Donnell Rawlings – comedian and actor
 Montie Rissell – convicted serial killer
 LaChina Robinson – basketball analyst, former college basketball player
 Tierra Ruffin-Pratt – basketball player
 Kali Uchis – singer songwriter producer (Class of 2011)
 Casey Wilson – actress and screenwriter (Class of 1998)
 Edward Wong – journalist and foreign correspondent

References
Notes

Public high schools in Virginia
Northern Virginia Scholastic Hockey League teams
Schools in Alexandria, Virginia
Educational institutions established in 1965
1965 establishments in Virginia